"Dushman Mera" is the fourth song from the soundtrack of  the film Don 2: The King is Back. The song is sung by Sunitha Sarathy and Shankar Mahadevan. Javed Akhtar is the lyricist. Shankar, Ehsaan & Loy were the three people who directed the song. It received very positive reviews from critics.

The song illustrates that although Don is Roma's sworn enemy, she may still have feelings for him.

References

External links

Songs written for films
2011 songs
Hindi film songs
Indian songs
Songs with lyrics by Javed Akhtar
Songs with music by Shankar–Ehsaan–Loy